Division No. 1, Subdivision C is an unorganized subdivision on the Avalon Peninsula in Newfoundland and Labrador, Canada. It is in Division 1 and contains the unincorporated communities of Cape St. Mary's, Cuslett, Gooseberry Cove, Great Barasway, Lears Cove, Patrick's Cove-Angels Cove, Ship Cove and Stoney House.

Cuslett

Cuslett is a settlement by the Atlantic Ocean in Newfoundland and Labrador.  Current population (2013): 37.

Gooseberry Cove (Placentia Bay)

Gooseberry Cove was a small town located on the south-east side of Placentia Bay in Newfoundland and Labrador. The town was first settled by farmers to supply food to the fishermen of the Sweetmans' firm based in nearby Placentia. Because of a lack of available land, distance from fishing grounds and a poor harbour the population remained small, peaking at 21 in 1911. Because of the small population there was never a school, church or medical facility built in Gooseberry Cove. The community was abandoned in the 1950s. In 1983 the beach at Gooseberry Cove, one of the few naturally sandy beaches in Newfoundland, was designated a public recreational beach.

Great Barasway

Great Barasway is a settlement in Newfoundland and Labrador.

Patrick's Cove-Angels Cove
see: Patrick's Cove-Angels Cove

References

 Smallwood, Joseph R. Encyclopedia of Newfoundland and Labrador, Newfoundland Book Publishers Ltd., 1967, p. 566
 

Newfoundland and Labrador subdivisions